The German futsal league system, or league pyramid, refers to the hierarchically interconnected league system for Futsal in Germany that in the 2017–18 season consists of the DFB Futsal Cup and 35 divisions, in which all divisions are bound together by the principle of promotion and relegation. Teams that finish at the top of their division at the end of each season can rise higher in the pyramid, while those that finish at the bottom find themselves sinking further down. In theory, it is possible for even the lowest local club to rise to the top of the system and become German futsal champions one day. The number of teams promoted and relegated between the divisions varies, and promotion to the upper levels of the pyramid is usually contingent on meeting additional criteria, especially concerning appropriate facilities and finances.

Structure

The German futsal league system is held under the jurisdiction of the nationwide German Football Association. 

On top of the system is the DFB Futsal Cup, an annual tournament to determine the German futsal champion and the team to represent Germany in the UEFA Futsal Cup. It is followed by the level one Futsal-Regionalliga, which is divided into 5 regional divisions under the 5 regional associations of the German Football association, these being the Northern German Football Association, the Northeastern German Football Association, the Western German Football Association, the Southwestern Regional Football Association and the Southern German Football Association. For Bavaria, the Bavarian Football Association, a member state association of the Southern German Football Association, runs their top division under their own jurisdiction. For the Southwest, a Futsal-Regionalliga has not yet been launched and the participants for the DFB Futsal Cup are determined by a futsal tournament. 

Starting at level five, the various fully amateur divisions are usually governed by the 21 state associations.

References

External links 
 German Futsal Leagues 
 German Football Association (German)
 Results and tables of all futsal leagues (German)

Futsal in Germany
Futsal leagues in Germany
Ger